Chikkalasandra is a suburb of Bangalore in the Indian state of Karnataka.

Demographics 
As of 2011 India census, Chikkalasandra had a population of 43,364.

References 

Neighbourhoods in Bangalore